Cochin House is the former residence of the Maharaja of Cochin in Delhi. It located at Jantar Mantar Road 3. It is also known as Cochin State Palace.

History
The house was originally built by Sujan Singh, a prominent Punjabi real estate builder based in New Delhi, as his private residence. In 1911, when New Delhi was announced as capital of then-the British India, Sujan Singh and his son Sobha Singh (1890–1978) became part of New Delhi construction project as senior sub-contractors. The structure was completed and furnished by 1911 as part of New Delhi City project. The house was named as Vyukunt, which was prominent landmark in New Delhi those time.

As part of new British India constitution, a chamber of princes was created in Indian Parliament to represent Indian Native princely states. As a result, it became a necessity for Indian Princes to visit New Delhi to attend the proceedings and lend their voice and concerns. In 1920, the ruler of Kingdom of Cochin, H.H Raja Rama Varma Maharaja of Kochi purchased Vyukunt from Sobha Singh and refurbished as Cochin State Palace. Alternate information is that it was built on orders of the Maharaja to accommodate himself during the Delhi Durbar of 1911. 

After Independence, when Cochin joined with India Union, the house became state property of Kerala Government. It is today a part of the wider Kerala House complex, which functions as an embassy of the state to the central government. In 2013, there were plans to renovate the building.

See also 
 Travancore House

References

Further reading

External links 

Royal residences in Delhi
History of Kochi
Government buildings in Delhi
Government of Kerala